Jeanne de Ponthieu, dame d'Épernon, Countess of Vendôme and of Castres, (Jeanne de Ponthieu, dame d'Épernon, comtesse de Vendôme et de Castres, before 1336 – 30 May 1376) better known in English as Joan of Ponthieu, was a French noblewoman, the youngest daughter of Jean II de Ponthieu, Count of Aumale. She was the wife of Jean VI de Vendôme, Count of Vendôme and of Castres. She acted as regent for her infant granddaughter Jeanne, suo jure Countess of Vendôme from 1371 until the child's premature death in 1372.

Family
Joan was born in France sometime before 1336, the youngest daughter of Jean II de Ponthieu, Count of Aumale, and Catherine d'Artois (1296 – November 1368). She had an elder sister Blanche de Ponthieu (before 1326 – 12 April/May 1387) who became suo jure Countess of Aumale on 16 January 1340 upon the death of their father. Blanche was the wife of Jean V de Harcourt, Count of Harcourt, by whom she had issue.

Joan, who was also known as the Dame d'Épernon, was a direct descendant of King Ferdinand III of Castile by his second wife Joan, Countess of Ponthieu. King Louis VIII of France and Blanche of Castile were also among her many royal ancestors. Her paternal grandparents were Jean I de Ponthieu, Count of Aumale and Ide de Meullent. Her maternal grandparents were Philip of Artois and Blanche of Brittany, also known as Blanche de Bretagne, herself the granddaughter of King Henry III of England and Eleanor of Provence. The seigneury of Épernon was part of her father's inheritance which came into his family about 1256 upon the marriage of his grandmother Laure de Montfort, Dame d'Épernon to the Infante Ferdinand of Castile, Count of Aumale.

Marriage and issue
On an unknown date sometime before 1351, Joan married Jean VI de Vendôme, Count of Vendôme and of Castres, Seigneur de Lézingnan-en-Narbonnois, and de Brétencourt of the House of Montoire. He was the son of Bouchard VI de Vendôme, Count of Vendôme and Alix de Bretagne. He succeeded to his titles in 1354; from that time onward, Joan was styled as Countess of Vendôme and of Castres. Jean and Joan together had two children:
Bouchard VII de Vendôme, Count of Vendôme and of Castres (c. 1351 – 16 November 1371), married in 1368 as her second husband, Isabelle de Bourbon, by whom he had one daughter, Joan, Countess of Vendôme and of Castres who died in 1372.
 Catherine de Vendôme (1354 – 1 April 1412), suo jure Countess of Vendôme and of Castres. On 28 September 1364 in Paris, she married John I, Count of La Marche, by whom she had seven children, including Charlotte de Bourbon-La Marche, Queen consort of Cyprus.

In 1362, the castle and town of Vendôme were plundered by the Anglo-Gascon troops of Captain Robert Marcault, and Joan was taken prisoner. She was later ransomed. In 1367, she ordered that the walls of the castle were to be strengthened, and personally superintended the fortifications.

Upon the death of her husband in February 1364 at Montpellier, Joan's son Bouchard became Count of Vendôme and of Castres. When he died in 1371, the titles passed to his infant daughter, Jeanne. Joan de Ponthieu acted as regent for her granddaughter from 1371 until the latter's death in 1372. The titles were inherited by Catherine, the only surviving child of Joan of Ponthieu. Catherine held the titles jointly with her husband until 1393, then with her second eldest son Louis, Count of Vendôme.

Joan died on 30 May 1376 at about the age of 40.

Ancestry

References

14th-century births
1376 deaths
French countesses
14th-century women rulers
Epernon, Lady of, Joan of Ponthieu
Medieval French nobility
14th-century French people
14th-century French women

Year of birth unknown